Ibotyporanga is a genus of spiders in the family Pholcidae. It was first described in 1944 by Mello-Leitão. , it contains 4 species, all from Brazil.

References

Pholcidae
Araneomorphae genera
Spiders of Brazil